Aberdeenshire or the County of Aberdeen is a historic county and registration county of Scotland. The area of the county, excluding the city of Aberdeen itself, is also a lieutenancy area. The county borders Kincardineshire, Angus and Perthshire to the south, Inverness-shire and Banffshire to the west, and the North Sea to the north and east.

The area is generally hilly, and from the south-west, near the centre of Scotland, the Grampians send out various branches, mostly to the north-east.

Symbols 

The coat of arms of Aberdeenshire County Council was granted in 1890. The four quarters represented the Buchan, Mar, Garioch and Strathbogie areas.

Constituencies 
There was an Aberdeenshire constituency of the House of Commons of the Parliament of Great Britain from 1708 to 1801 and of the Parliament of the United Kingdom from 1801 to 1868. This constituency did not include the parliamentary burgh of Aberdeen, which was represented as a component of Aberdeen District of Burghs until 1832, when it was enlarged and became the Aberdeen burgh constituency. The other components of the district of burghs became components of the then new Montrose District of Burghs.

In 1868 the Aberdeenshire constituency was divided to form two new county divisions, or county constituencies, namely Eastern Aberdeenshire and Western Aberdeenshire.

In 1885 the Aberdeen burgh constituency was divided to form the burgh constituencies of Aberdeen North and Aberdeen South.

In 1918 Aberdeenshire and Kincardineshire were treated as if a single county for parliamentary representation purposes, with the area of the Kincardineshire county constituency and the Aberdeenshire constituencies being divided into three new constituencies, Kincardine and Western Aberdeenshire, Aberdeen and Kincardine Central and Aberdeen and Kincardine East. Kincardine and Western Aberdeenshire included the whole of the former Kincardineshire constituency.

In 1950 the area of the former Kincardinshire constituency (as abolished in 1918) was merged into the then new North Angus and Mearns constituency, and the Aberdeenshire area was divided into the East Aberdeenshire constituency and the West Aberdeenshire constituency, but the boundary between these new eastern and western constituencies differed from that for the constituencies of the 1868 to 1918 period.

Boundary changes in 1955 enlarged the Aberdeenshire West constituency, and reduced the size of the Aberdeenshire East constituency.

In 1983, eight years after the local government county of Aberdeenshire was abolished, the Aberdeenshire constituencies were replaced with new constituencies.

Geography

Aberdeenshire has been traditionally divided into five districts:
Mar, mostly between the Dee and Don, which nearly covers the southern half of the county and contains the city of Aberdeen. It is mountainous, especially Braemar, which contains the greatest mass of elevated land in the British Isles. The Dee valley has sandy soil, the Don valley loamy.
Formartine, between the lower Don and Ythan, has a sandy coast, which is succeeded inland by a clayey, fertile, tilled tract, and then by low hills, moors, mosses and tilled land.
Buchan lies north of the Ythan, and comprising the north-east of the county, is next in size to Mar, parts of the coast being bold and rocky, the interior bare, low, flat, undulating and in places peaty. On the coast, six miles (10 km) south of Peterhead, are the Bullers of Buchan – a basin in which the sea, entering by a natural arch, boils up violently in stormy weather. Buchan Ness is the most easterly point of Scotland.
Garioch, in the centre of the shire, comprises an undulating, loamy, fertile valley, formerly called the granary of Aberdeen.
Strathbogie, occupying a considerable area south of the Deveron, mostly consists of hills, moors and mosses.

The interior mountains of the Cairngorms provide the most striking of the physical features of the county:
Ben Macdhui, a magnificent mass, the second highest mountain in the United Kingdom (shared with Banffshire)
Braeriach 
Cairn Toul, 
Beinn a' Bhùird, 
Ben Avon, 
"Dark" Lochnagar, 
Cairn Eas,
Sgarsoch, 
Culardoch 

Farther north rise the Buck of Cabrach,  on the Banffshire border, Tap o' Noth, Bennachie, which from its central position is a landmark visible from many different parts of the county, and which is celebrated in John Imlah's song, O gin I war faur the Gadie rins, and Foudland, .

In 1911 the rivers abounded with salmon and trout, and the pearl mussel occurs in the Ythan and Don. A valuable pearl in the Scottish crown is said to be from the Ythan. There are noted chalybeate springs at Peterhead, Fraserburgh, and Pannanich near Ballater. Other lochs of note are Loch Kinord, Loch Davan, Dubh Loch, Lochnagar, Sandy Loch, Loch Callater, Loch Phadraig, Loch nan Eun and the Loch of Skene.

Geology
The greater part of the county is composed of crystalline schists belonging to the metamorphic rocks of the Eastern Highlands.

In the upper parts of the valleys of the Dee and the Don they form well-marked groups, of which the most characteristic are:
the black schists and phyllites, with flints, and a thin band of tremolite limestone,
the main or Blair Atholl limestone,
the quartzite.

These divisions are folded on highly inclined or vertical axes trending north-east and south-west, and hence the same zones are repeated over a considerable area. The quartzite is generally regarded as the highest member of the series. Excellent sections showing the component strata occur in Glen Clunie and its tributary valleys above Braemar. Eastwards down the Dee and the Don and northwards across the plain of Buchan towards Rattray Head and Fraserburgh there is a development of biotite gneiss, partly of sedimentary and perhaps partly of igneous origin. A belt of slate which has been quarried for roofing purposes runs along the west border of the county from Turriff by Auchterless and the Foudland Hills towards the Tap o' Noth near Gartly. The metamorphic rocks have been invaded by igneous materials, some before, and by far the larger series after the folding of the strata.

The basic types of the former are represented by the sills of epidiorite and hornblende gneiss in Glen Muick and Glen Callater, which have been permeated by granite and pegmatite in veins and lenticles, often foliated. The later granites subsequent to the plication of the schists have a wide distribution on the Ben Macdhui and Ben Avon range, and on Lochnagar; they stretch eastwards from Ballater by Tarland to Aberdeen and north to Bennachie. Isolated masses appear at Peterhead and at Strichen.

Though consisting mainly of biotite granite, these later intrusions pass by intermediate stages into diorite, as in the area between Balmoral and the head-waters of the Gairn. The granites have been extensively quarried at Rubislaw, Peterhead and Kemnay.

Serpentinite and troctolite, the precise age of which is uncertain, occur at the Black Dog Rock north of Aberdeen, at Belhelvie and near Old Meldrum. Where the schists of sedimentary origin have been pierced by these igneous intrusions, they are charged with contact minerals such as sillimanite, cordierite, kyanite and andalusite. Cordierite-bearing rocks occur near Ellon, at the foot of Bennachie, and on the top of the Buck of Cabrach.

A banded and mottled calc-silicate hornfels occurring with the limestone at Derry Falls, west-northwest of Braemar, has yielded malacolite, wollastonite, brown idocrase, garnet, sphene and hornblende.

A larger list of minerals has been obtained from an exposure of limestone and associated beds in Glen Gairn, about four miles (6 km) above the point where that river joins the Dee.

Narrow belts of Old Red Sandstone, resting unconformably on the old platform of slates and schists, have been traced from the north coast at Peterhead by Turriff to Fyvie, and also from Huntly by Gartly to Kildrummy Castle. The strata consist mainly of conglomerates and sandstones, which, at Gartly and at Rhynie, are associated with lenticular bands of andesite indicating contemporaneous volcanic action. Small outliers of conglomerate and sandstone of this age have recently been found in the course of excavations in Aberdeen.

The glacial deposits, especially in the belt bordering the coast between Aberdeen and Peterhead, furnish important evidence. The ice moved eastwards off the high ground at the head of the Dee and the Don, while the mass spreading outwards from the Moray Firth invaded the low plateau of Buchan; but at a certain stage there was a marked defection northwards parallel with the coast, as proved by the deposit of red clay north of Aberdeen. At a later date the local glaciers laid down materials on top of the red clay.

The committee appointed by the British Association proved that the Greensand, which has yielded a large suite of Cretaceous fossils at Moreseat, in the parish of Cruden, occurs in glacial drift, resting probably on granite. The strata from which the Moreseat fossils were derived are not now found in place in that part of Scotland, but Mr Jukes Brown considers that the horizon of the fossils is that of the lower Greensand of the Isle of Wight or the Aptien stage of France. Chalk flints are widely distributed in the drift between Fyvie and the east coast of Buchan. At Plaidy a patch of clay with Liassic fossils occurs. At several localities between Logie Coldstone and Dinnet a deposit of diatomite (Kieselguhr) occurs beneath the peat.

Flora and fauna
The tops of the highest mountains have an Arctic flora. Trees, especially Scotch fir and larch, grow well, and Braemar has plentiful natural timber, said to surpass any in the north of Europe. Stumps of Scotch fir and oak found in peat sometimes far exceed any now growing in size.

Grouse, partridges and hares abound, and rabbits are often numerous. Red deer abound in Braemar, which in 1911 had the most extensive deer forest in Scotland.

Economy

Agriculture
Except in the mountainous districts, Aberdeenshire has a comparatively mild climate, owing to the proximity of much of the shire to the sea. The mean annual temperature at Braemar reaches , and that at Aberdeen . Poor, gravelly, clayey and peaty soils prevail, but tile-draining, bones and guano, and the best methods of modern tillage, greatly increased the produce.

Indeed, in 1911, no part of Scotland had a more productive soil developed out of such unpromising material. Farm-houses and steadings have much improved, and the best agricultural implements and machines get widespread use. About two-thirds of the population depend entirely on agriculture. Farms are small compared with those in the south-eastern counties. Oats form the predominant crop, wheat has practically gone out of cultivation, but barley has largely increased.

The most distinctive industry in 1911 was cattle-feeding. Aberdeenshire fattens a great number of the home-bred crosses for the London and local markets, and imports Irish animals on an extensive scale for the same purpose, while an exceedingly heavy trade in dead meat for London and the south occurs all over the county. Farmers also raise sheep, horses and pigs in large numbers.

Since the encyclopedia article was published in 1911, there have been significant changes. Few Irish cattle now come in, the area is still famed for cattle, more commonly continental breeds, with most slaughtered in Scotland, and in particular a good local abattoir capacity. Spring Barley is the predominant crop, and in lowland Winter Wheat, Oil Seed Rape & Potatoes would be more common than oats. There is also a significant area of carrots grown. With no slaughter capacity in Scotland the pig industry is diminishing but still a very important part of the North East economy. Farm sizes are perhaps still relatively smaller than UK but there are some significant agribusinesses in Aberdeenshire. Few farmers raise horses, though horses are more common, kept by private owners & specialists, than in any other area of Scotland.

Fisheries
In 1911 a large fishing population in villages along the coast engage in the white and herring fishery, fostering the next most important industry to agriculture.

Aberdeenshire fishing developed almost exclusively due to the introduction of steam trawlers. In 1911 the total value of the annual catch, of which between a half and a third consists of herrings, amounts to £1,000,000.

In 1911 the industry produced both speldings (salted and rock-dried haddocks) and finnans (smoked haddocks). The ports and creeks belong to the fishery districts of Peterhead, Fraserburgh and Aberdeen, the last of which includes also three Kincardineshire ports. The herring season for Aberdeen, Peterhead and Fraserburgh lasts from June to September, at which time the ports become crowded with boats from other Scottish districts. Valuable salmon-fishings exist – rod, net and stake-net – on the Dee, Don, Ythan and Ugie.

Other industries
Manufactures mainly cluster in or near the city of Aberdeen, but throughout the rural districts one finds much milling of corn, brick and tile making, smith-work, brewing and distilling, cart and farm-implement making, casting and drying of peat, and timber-felling, especially on Deeside and Donside, for pit-props, railway sleepers, laths and barrel staves. A number of paper-making establishments operate, most of them on the Don near Aberdeen.

In 1911 the chief mineral wealth comes from the noted durable granite, quarried at Aberdeen, Kemnay, Peterhead and elsewhere including for causewaying stones. Sandstone and other rocks are also quarried at different parts. The shire imports mostly coal, lime, timber, iron, slate, raw materials for the textile manufactures, wheat, cattle-feeding stuffs, bones, guano, sugar, alcoholic liquors, fruits. The exports include granite (rough-dressed and polished), flax, woollen and cotton goods, paper, combs, preserved provisions, oats, barley, and live and dead cattle.

In last quarter of the 20th Century and into the 21st the North Sea oil industry was to become a large employer and overseas revenue earner. Much of the industry's onshore facilities are based in Aberdeen.

Transport

On the south Aberdeen city has rail links with Stonehaven, Montrose and Dundee, and to the north-west a line runs to Inverness via Huntly, Keith and Elgin.

Branch lines from various points used to run to several smaller towns, e.g. from Aberdeen to Ballater by Deeside, from Aberdeen to Fraserburgh (with a branch at Maud for Peterhead and at Ellon for Cruden Bay and Boddam), from Kintore to Alford, and from Inverurie to Old Meldrum and also to Macduff. These lines all closed, largely as a result of the Beeching Axe in the 1960s, they now serve as local pathways or bicycle tracks.

By sea Aberdeenshire has regular communication with the Orkney Islands and the Shetland Islands.

Over the 20th Century road and air communications have improved. A total of nearly 3.5 million passengers used the airport in 2015, a fall of 6.8% compared with 2014.

Population and government 
In 1801 the population numbered 284,036 and in 1901 304,439 (of whom 159,603 were females), or 154 persons to the square mile (59/km2). In 1901 Aberdeenshire had 8 persons who spoke Gaelic only, and 1333 who spoke Gaelic and English. The chief towns include Aberdeen (population in 1901, 153,503), Bucksburn (2231), Fraserburgh (9105), Huntly (4136), Inverurie (3624), Peterhead (11,794), Turriff (2273). The county total was 137, 962 in 1971.

In 1911 the Supreme Court of Justiciary sat in Aberdeen to try cases from the counties of Aberdeen, Banff and Kincardine. The three counties are under a sheriff, and two sheriffs-substitute reside in Aberdeen, and also sat at Fraserburgh, Huntly, Peterhead and Turriff. The sheriff courts occurred in Aberdeen and Peterhead.

The higher branches of education have always been thoroughly taught in the schools throughout the shire, and pupils have long been in the habit of going directly from the schools to the university.

According to the 1911 Encyclopædia, Aberdeenshire people have a quick, sharp, rather angry accent. As recently as 1830 Gaelic provided the fireside language of almost every family in Braemar, but by the start of the 20th century was little used.

History 
The country later forming the shires of Aberdeen and Banff once served as home to the northern Picts, whom Ptolemy called Taixall, dubbing the territory Taixalon. Their town of Devana, once supposed to be the modern Aberdeen, has been identified by John Stuart with a site in the parish of Peterculter, where there are remains of an ancient camp at Normandykes, and by William Forbes Skene with a station on Loch Davan, west of Aboyne.  Roman Camps have also been discovered on the upper Ythan and Deveron, but evidence of effective Roman occupation is still to seek. Traces of the native inhabitants, however, occur much more frequently. Weems or earth-houses occur fairly commonly in the west. Relics of crannogs or lake-dwellings exist at Loch Kinord, five miles (8 km) northeast of Ballater, at Loch Goul in the parish of New Machar and elsewhere. Duns or forts occur on hills at Dunecht, where the dun encloses an area of two acres (8,000 m2), Barra near Old Meldrum, Tap o' Noth, Dunnideer near Insch and other places. Monoliths, standing stones and "druidical" circles of the pagan period abound, as do many examples of the sculptured stones of the early Christian epoch.

Efforts to convert the Picts started with Teman in the 5th century, and continued with Columba (who founded a monastery at Old Deer), Drostan, Maluog, and Machar, lasting results emerged only slowly. Indeed, dissensions within the Columban church and the expulsion of the clergy from Pictland by the Pictish king Nectan in the 8th century undid most of the progress that missionaries had made. The Vikings and Danes periodically raided the coast, but after Macbeth ascended the throne of Scotland in 1040, the Orkney men, under the guidance of Thorfinn Sigurdsson, refrained from further trouble in the north-east. Macbeth was afterwards slain at Lumphanan (1057), a cairn on Perkhill marking the spot.

The influence of the Norman Conquest of England made itself felt even in Aberdeenshire. Along with numerous Anglo-Saxon exiles, there also settled in the country Flemings who introduced various industries, Saxons who brought farming, and Scandinavians who taught nautical skill. The Celts revolted more than once, but Malcolm Canmore and his successors crushed them and confiscated their lands. In the reign of Alexander I (ruled 1107–1124) mention first appears of Aberdeen (originally called Abordon and, in the Norse sagas, Apardion), which received its charter from William the Lion in 1179, by which date its burgesses had already combined with those of Banff, Elgin, Inverness and other trans-Grampian communities to form a free Hanse, under which they enjoyed exceptional trading privileges. By this time, too, the Church had extended its organisation, establishing the bishopric of Aberdeen in 1150.

In the 12th and 13th centuries some of the great Aberdeenshire families arose, including the earl of Mar (c. 1122), the Leslies, Freskins (ancestors of the dukes of Sutherland), Durwards, Bysets, Comyns and Cheynes; significantly, in most cases their founders had immigrated to the district.

The Celtic thanes and their retainers slowly fused with the settlers. They declined to take advantage of the disturbed condition of the country during the wars of the Scots independence, and made common cause with the bulk of the nation.

Though John Comyn (d. 1300?), one of the competitors for the throne, had considerable interests in the shire, his claim received locally little support. In 1296 Edward I made a triumphal march to the north to terrorise the more turbulent nobles. Next year William Wallace surprised the English garrison in Aberdeen, but failed to capture the castle. In 1303 Edward again visited the county, halting at the Castle of Kildrummy, then in the possession of Robert Bruce, who shortly afterwards became the acknowledged leader of the Scots and made Aberdeen his headquarters for several months. Despite the seizure of Kildrummy Castle by the English in 1306, Bruce's prospects brightened from 1308, when he defeated John Comyn, earl of Buchan (died 1313?), at Inverurie.

For a hundred years after Robert Bruce's death (1329) intermittent anarchy occurred in the shire. The English burned Aberdeen itself in 1336, and the re-settlement of the districts of Buchan and Strathbogie occasioned constant quarrels on the part of the dispossessed. Moreover, the crown had embroiled itself with some of the Highland chieftains, whose independence it sought to abolish. This policy culminated in the invasion of Aberdeenshire by Donald, Lord of the Isles, who, however, suffered defeat at Harlaw, near Inverurie, at the hands of the Earl of Mar in 1411.

In the 15th century two further leading county families emerged: Sir Alexander Forbes becoming Lord Forbes about 1442, and Sir Alexander Seton, Lord Gordon in 1437 and Earl of Huntly in 1445. Bitter feuds raged between these families for a long period, but the Gordons reached the height of their power in the first half of the 16th century, when their domains, already vast, were enhanced by the acquisition, through marriage, of the Earldom of Sutherland (1514).

Meanwhile, commerce with the Low Countries, Poland and the Baltic had grown apace, Campvere (Veere in Dutch), near Flushing (Vlissingen) in the Netherlands, becoming the emporium of the Scottish traders, while education was fostered by the foundation of King's College, Aberdeen in 1497 (Marischal College followed a century later). At the Reformation so little intuition had the clergy of the drift of opinion that at the very time that religious structures were being despoiled in the south, the building and decoration of churches went on in the shire. Protestantism came in without much tumult, though rioting took place in Aberdeen and St. Machar's Cathedral in the city suffered damage. The Earl of Huntly offered some resistance, on behalf of the Catholics, to the influence of James Stewart, 1st Earl of Moray, who was regent during the reign of James VI, but was defeated and killed at Corrichie on the Hill of Fare in 1562.

As years passed it became apparent that Presbyterianism gained less generally support than Episcopacy, of which system Aberdeenshire remained for generations the stronghold in Scotland.

Another crisis in ecclesiastical affairs arose in 1638, when the authorities ordered subscription to the National Covenant. Aberdeenshire responded so grudgingly to this demand that James Graham, 1st Marquess of Montrose visited the shire in the following year to enforce acceptance. The Cavaliers, not being disposed to yield, dispersed an armed gathering of Covenanters in the affair called the Trot of Turriff (1639), shedding the first blood of the civil war. The Covenanters obtained the upper hand in a few weeks, when Montrose appeared at the Bridge of Dee and compelled the surrender of Aberdeen, which had no choice but to cast in its lot with the victors.

Montrose, however, soon changed sides, and after defeating the Covenanters under Lord Balfour of Burleigh (1644), delivered the city to rapine. He worsted the Covenanters again after a stiff fight on 2 July 1645, at Alford, a village in the beautiful Howe of Alford. Peace was temporarily restored on the "engagement" of the Scots commissioners to assist Charles I.

Aberdeen welcomed Charles II on his return from the Netherlands in 1650, but in little more than a year General George Monck entered the city at the head of the Cromwellian regiments. The English garrison remained until 1659, but the following year Aberdeenshire effusively hailed the Restoration, and prelacy once more went into the ascendant. Most of the Presbyterians conformed, but the Quakers, more numerous in the shire and the adjoining county of Kincardineshire than anywhere else in Scotland, suffered systematic persecution.

After the Glorious Revolution (1688) episcopacy passed under a cloud, but the clergy, yielding to force majeure, gradually accepted the inevitable, hoping, as long as Queen Anne lived, that prelacy might yet become the national form of Church government. Her death dissipated these dreams, and as George I, her successor, was antipathetic to the clergy, it happened that Jacobitism and episcopalianism came to be regarded in the shire as identical, though the non-jurors as a body never countenanced rebellion.

On 6 September 1715 the Earl of Mar raised the standard of revolt in Braemar; a fortnight later James Francis Edward Stuart was proclaimed at Aberdeen cross; the Pretender landed at Peterhead on 22 December, and in February 1716 he was back again in France. The collapse of the first rising ruined many of the lairds, and when the second rebellion occurred thirty years afterwards the county in the main remained apathetic, though the insurgents held Aberdeen for five months, and Lord Lewis Gordon won a trifling victory for Prince Charles Edward Stuart at Inverurie (23 December 1745). The Duke of Cumberland relieved Aberdeen at the end of February 1746, and by April the Young Pretender had become a fugitive.

Thereafter the people devoted themselves to agriculture, industry and commerce, which developed by leaps and bounds, and, along with equally remarkable progress in education, transformed the aspect of the shire and made the community as a whole one of the most prosperous in Scotland.

Between 1890 and 1975, Aberdeenshire was one of the administrative counties of Scotland, governed by a county council. In 1900, the county town of Aberdeen became a county of a city and was thus removed from the administrative county. In 1975 the Local Government (Scotland) Act 1973 reorganised local administration in Scotland into a two-tier system of regions and districts. The administrative counties of Aberdeenshire, the City of Aberdeen, Banffshire, Kincardineshire and most of Morayshire were merged to form Grampian Region, with the area of county being divided between the districts of City of Aberdeen, Banff and Buchan, Gordon and Kincardine and Deeside for administration. Aberdeen County Council was based at County Buildings in Union Terrace, Aberdeen.

In 1996 Scottish local government system was reorganised a second time to form a single tier of unitary council areas. The name was revived in local government for the council area of Aberdeenshire, which has vastly different boundaries.

Towns and villages

Aberdeen
Aboyne
Alford
Auchnagatt
Ballater
Balmedie
Barthol Chapel
Belhelvie
Bieldside
Blackburn
Boddam
Boyndie
Braegarie
Braemar
Braeside
Bridge of Alford
Bridge of Don
Broomhill
Buchanhaven
Cabrach
Cairnbulg
Clatt
Collieston
Cornhill
Craigiebuckler
Crimond
Cruden Bay
Crudie
Cults
Cuminestown
Cummings Park
Danestone
Daviot
Dinnet
Dunecht
Dyce
Echt
Ellon
Ferrydee
Fetterangus
Finzean
Footdee
Foresterhill
Fraserburgh
Fyvie
Garthdee
Gartly
Hatton
Hatton of Fintray
Hazlehead
Heugh Head
Hilton
Huntly
Insch
Inverallochy
Inverugie
Kaimhill
Keig
Kemnay
Kennethmont
Kincardine O'Neil
Kingseat
Kingswells
Kintore
Kirkton of Bourtie
Kirkton of Skene
Little Lynturk
Logie Coldstone
Longhaven
Longside
Lonmay
Lumphanan
Lumsden
Lyne of Skene
Mannofield
Mastrick
Maud
Memsie
Methlick
Midstocket
Milltimber
Mintlaw
Monymusk
Muir of Fowlis
New Blyth
Newburgh
New Deer
New Leeds
New Pitsligo
Newmachar
Northfield
Old Deer
Oldmeldrum
Old Rayne
Peterculter
Peterhead
Pitmedden
Pittulie
Port Elphinstone
Potterton
Rhynie
Rosehearty
Rosemount
Rothienorman
Rubislaw
Ruthven
St. Comb's
St Fergus
Stoneywood
Strathdon
Strichen
Stuartfield
Tarland
Tarves
Tillydrone
Torphins
Turriff
Tyrie
Udny Green
West End
Westhill
Whiteford
Woodside

Places of interest

See also
List of counties of Scotland 1890–1975
Medieval Diocese of Aberdeen

Notes

References

Attribution

External links
 Aberdeenshire, A Topographical Dictionary of Scotland (1846), (British History Online)

Counties of Scotland
Lieutenancy areas of Scotland
History of Aberdeenshire
Counties of the United Kingdom (1801–1922)